Bahtit   is a village in the Markaz Abou Hammad in the Sharqia Governorate of Egypt. It has a population of 10,904 according to the 2006 Egyptian census.

Notable persons
 Mohammed Murad Ghaleb, Egyptian Minister of Foreign Affairs from January to September 1972.
 Dr. Mabrouk Sami, A young Egyptian scientist in the field of Geochemistry since 2010 up till now.

See also
 Sharqia Governorate

References

Populated places in Sharqia Governorate